The Dominican Summer League Orioles or DSL Orioles are a Minor League Baseball team of the Dominican Summer League and Rookie affiliates of the Baltimore Orioles. They are located in Boca Chica, Santo Domingo, Dominican Republic. Since 2019, the team has been split into two squads, DSL Orioles 1 and DSL Orioles 2.

Rosters

References
 "2012 Calendar - Boca Chica Baseball City." Dominican Summer League. 2012. Retrieved on 25 May 2012.

External links
 Dominican Summer Orioles page at MiLB.com

Dominican Summer League teams
Baseball teams in the Dominican Republic
Baltimore Orioles minor league affiliates
Sport in Santo Domingo